Jeff G. Schneeweis (born June 1, 1981) is an American singer, songwriter, multi-instrumentalist, audio engineer and record producer from Redding, California, best known as the founder and vocalist/guitar player for Number One Gun, with whom he released five studio albums (two of which were fully recorded and produced by Schneeweis as a solo artist) and one EP.

In 2011, Schneeweis and his Number One Gun bandmate, bassist Trevor Sellers, and Sarah Ann (from See You Soon) formed the trio The Make and released This Box EP.

In 2013, Schneeweis started a solo project under his own name and released two EPs, but in 2015 changed his creative moniker to Lael.

Throughout his career, Schneeweis worked with and produced for a number of artists including Abigail Breslin, Nolan Gross, Luna, Luna, Bethel Music

Discography
With Number One Gun
 see Number One Gun
With The Make
 2011 - This Box EP
As Jeff Schneeweis
 2013 - Covers EP
 2013 - Closer EP
As Lael
2016 - Clarity
2017 - Phoenix
2019 -  "Bike on spotify"

References

Living people
American singer-songwriters
1981 births
21st-century American singers